Marteg Halt railway station was a station to the northwest of Rhayader, Powys, Wales. The station closed in 1962.

References

Further reading

Disused railway stations in Powys
Railway stations in Great Britain opened in 1931
Railway stations in Great Britain closed in 1962
Former Great Western Railway stations
Rhayader